Weyhausen is a municipality in the district of Gifhorn, in Lower Saxony, Germany.

History
The earliest surviving record dates from 1344, naming the settlement as Weydehusen.  In 1350 it was rebuilt following destruction by fire.   The earliest known basis of the village was as a Wendish (Sorbian) cluster of log huts.

A directory in 1850 indicates that at that time Weyhausen contained 16 farmsteads.

References

Gifhorn (district)